Qu'Appelle—Moose Mountain was a federal electoral district in Saskatchewan, Canada, that was represented in the House of Commons of Canada from 1968 to 1988.

This riding was created in 1966 from parts of Moose Mountain and Qu'Appelle ridings

It consisted of a part of Saskatchewan lying south of the Qu'Appelle River and east of the 2nd meridian.

It was abolished in 1987 when it was redistributed into Regina—Qu'Appelle  and Souris—Moose Mountain ridings.

Election results

See also 

 List of Canadian federal electoral districts
 Past Canadian electoral districts

External links 
 

Former federal electoral districts of Saskatchewan